1166 Avenue of the Americas (also known as the International Paper Building) is a  tall office building at 1166 Sixth Avenue between 45th and 46th Street in the Midtown Manhattan neighborhood of New York City. It was completed in 1974 and has 44 floors totaling approximately 1.7 million square feet. Skidmore, Owings & Merrill designed the building. It is the headquarters of the Marsh & McLennan Companies; Penton, D. E. Shaw & Co., William Blair & Company, 5W Public Relations, FTI Consulting and Huron Consulting Group are also tenants.

The building was built in partnership with the Tishman Organization (predecessor to Tishman Speyer), Stanley Stahl and Arlen Realty.

See also
List of tallest buildings in New York City

References

External links

Skyscraper office buildings in Manhattan
Office buildings completed in 1974
Midtown Manhattan
Office buildings in Manhattan
Sixth Avenue
Skidmore, Owings & Merrill buildings
1974 establishments in New York City